Diederimyces is a genus of fungi in the family Verrucariaceae. A monotypic genus, it contains the single species Diederimyces fuscideae.

The genus name of Diederimyces is in honour of Paul Diederich (b.1959) Luxemburg born mathematician and botanist (Mycology and Lichenology).

The genus was circumscribed by Javier Etayo Salazar in Nova Hedwigia Vol.61 (1-2) on page 190 in 1995.

References

External links
Index Fungorum

Verrucariales
Monotypic Ascomycota genera